NA-234 Karachi Korangi-II is a constituency for the National Assembly of Pakistan. The constituency represents much of Korangi, and the western parts of Landhi.

Members of Parliament

2002–2018: NA-255 Karachi-XVII

Since 2018: NA-240 Karachi Korangi-II

Election 2002 

General elections were held on 10 Oct 2002. Mahmood Ahmed Qureshi of Mohajir Qaumi Movement - Haqiqi won by 31,096 votes.

Election 2008 

General elections were held on 18 Feb 2008. Syed Asif Hasnain of Muttahida Qaumi Movement won by 157,971 votes.

Election 2013 

General elections were held on 11 May 2013. Syed Asif Hasnain of Muttahida Qaumi Movement won by 136,982 votes and became the member of National Assembly.

Election 2018 

General elections were held on 25 July 2018.

†MQM contested this election as MQM-P

By-election 2022 
By-elections were held on 16 June 2022 after the death of former MNA, Iqbal Muhammad Ali Khan. Mohammad Abubakar of Muttahida Qaumi Movement – Pakistan won by securing 10,683 votes.

See also
NA-233 Karachi Korangi-I
NA-235 Karachi Korangi-III

References

External links 
Election result's official website

NA-255
Karachi